Braddocks Hay is a village in Staffordshire, England. Population details for the 2011 census can be found under Biddulph

Villages in Staffordshire
Biddulph